Le Déjeuner sur l'herbe is an 1866 painting by Claude Monet, a smaller version of a slightly earlier work now in the Musée d'Orsay. It is now in the Pushkin Museum in Moscow.

History
Le Déjeuner sur l'herbe was first exhibited in Louis Latouche's art gallery, and was in the collection of the opera singer Jean-Baptiste Faure for a time. It was exhibited at the 1900 exhibition of Monet's works at the Durand-Ruel gallery. On seeing it at the 1900 Exposition Universelle, Alexandre Benois described it as "perhaps Monet's most brilliant work" and "one of the most beautiful [works] of the entire 20th century".

Sergei Shchukin bought the painting from Monet himself in November 1904 for 30,000 francs, via the art dealer Paul Cassirer, the thirteenth Monet work he acquired. His collection was seized by the Soviet state in May 1918, with Le Déjeuner initially going to the State Museum of New Western Art and then, from 1948, being hung in its present home.

References

1867 paintings
Paintings by Claude Monet
Paintings in the collection of the Pushkin Museum
Food and drink paintings
Dogs in art